The 2020 Big South Conference men's soccer season is the 37th season of men's varsity soccer in the conference. The season is scheduled to begin on February 21 and conclude on April 8, 2021.

The season was originally scheduled to be played from August 28 to November 6, 2020, but was postponed due to the COVID-19 pandemic.

Background

Impact of the COVID-19 pandemic on the season  

The COVID-19 pandemic widely disrupted all sporting activities across the NCAA, including men's soccer. Prior to the pandemic, the regular season was scheduled to begin on August 30, 2020 and conclude on November 6, 2020 culminating with the Big South Tournament in mid-November and the NCAA Tournament in late November into mid-December.

On July 22, 2020, the conference announced plans to begin the season during the fall 2020 semester, with a September 3 start date. On August 12, 2020, the conference reversed its decision, cancelling fall sporting activities, and targeting a spring 2021 semester start for all fall sports.

Details around the spring 2021 season became known on November 5, 2020 when the Big South Conference announced the schedule for the spring of 2021. Teams would play an eight-match conference schedule starting on February 21, 2021. Teams are permitted to schedule three non-conference matches, starting no earlier than February 14, 2021. The final game of the regular season is scheduled for April 8, 2021.

The tournament was reduced to four teams and will begin on April 12, 2021 and conclude on April 18, 2021.

Teams

Stadiums and locations

Head coaches

Preseason

Preseason poll 
The preseason poll was released on January 28, 2021.

Preseason national polls 
The preseason national rankings are normally announced in August. United Soccer Coaches, Soccer America, and TopDrawerSoccer.com delayed their Top-25 preseason poll to the start of the spring season. CollegeSoccerNews.com did a Top-30 preseason poll in September 2020. TopDrawer Soccer, Soccer America, and United Soccer Coaches released their rankings in February 2021.

Preseason honors 

 Preseason Offensive Player of the Year – Matt Lock, Campbell
 Preseason Defensive Player of the Year – Luca Ziegler, Presbyterian

Regular season

Weekly results 
Legend

All times Eastern time.

Week 1 (Feb. 3 – Feb. 7)
No Big South Teams scheduled matches during Week 1.

Week 2 (Feb. 8 – Feb. 14)

Week 3 (Feb. 15 – Feb. 21)

Week 4 (Feb. 22 – Feb. 28)

Week 5 (Mar. 1 – Mar. 7)

Week 6 (Mar. 8 – Mar. 14)

Week 7 (Mar. 15 – Mar. 21)

Week 8 (Mar. 22 – Mar. 28)

Week 9 (Mar. 29 – Apr. 4)

Week 10 (Apr. 5 – Apr. 11)

Postseason

Big South Tournament 

The top four teams will qualify for the tournament. The tournament will be played April 12–18.

NCAA Tournament 

The Big South Tournament winner will qualify for the NCAA Tournament. Other teams can still earn an at-large bid into the tournament.

Postseason awards and honors

MLS SuperDraft 

The 2021 MLS SuperDraft was held in January 2021.

Total picks by school

List of selections

Notable undrafted players 
The following players went pro after the 2020 season despite not getting drafted in the 2021 MLS draft.

References

External links 
 Sun Belt Conference Men's Soccer

 
2020 NCAA Division I men's soccer season
Association football events postponed due to the COVID-19 pandemic